Ilya Mohadab Sasson commonly known as Elias Moadab  (6 February 1916 – 28 May 1952) was an Egyptian comedy actor, born to a Jewish Syrian father and Jewish Egyptian mother from the city of Tanta. He graduated from the Lycee school in 1923 and lived in the old Jewish quarter of Cairo.

Elias began his artistic career as a singer (Monologist) in the famous nightclub «Alooberg» where he was introduced to Bishara Wakim and Ismail Yasin, they opened the doors for him to work in the films.

Elias met the famous dancer Beba Izz Al-Din, which also he worked with her for a period.

He worked also in several nightclubs, including (Al Ariozna) and (Helmia Palace).

Filmography
«Habib al omr» 1947 with Farid al-Atrash, Samia Gamal and Ismail Yasin.
«Sittat afarit» 1947 with Mahmoud el-Meliguy, Mohamed Fawzi and Ismail Yasin.
«the soul and the body» 1948 with Camelia, Mohamed Fawzi, Kamal Al-Shennawi and Sفhadia.
«Amber » with Leila Mourad, Anwar Wagdi, Aziz Othman and Ismail Yasin.
«people talk » 1949 with Shadia and Ibrahim Hamouda.
«Mandeel El Helw » with Tahiya Karioka, Mahmoud Abdel Aziz and Marie Munib.
«Sharei El Bahlwan» with Camelia, Ismail Yasin and Kamal Al-Shennawi.
«Lilet El Eeed» with Ismail Yasin, Shadia and Mahmoud Choukoukou.
«Einy Be Tref» with Tahiya Karioka, Karem Mahmoud, and Mahmoud el-Meliguy.
«Sitt al hosn» 1950 with Samia Gamal,Leila Fawzi, Kamal Al-Shennawi, Huda Sultan and Aziz Osman .
«Felfel» with Ismail Yasin, Lola Sedki And Magda.
«Hero» with Ismail Yasin and Tahiya Karioka.
«Siboni Aghani» with Sabah, Ismail Yasin and Saad Abdel-Wahab.
«apportionment and share» with Aziza Amir, Yahya Shaheen and Tahiya Karioka.
«Fayeq and Rayeq» 1951 with Karem Mahmoud, Ismail Yasin and Tahiya Karioka.
«Katr El Naadah» with Shadia, Kamal Al-Shennawi and Ismail Yasin.
«El Banat Sharbat » with Ismail Yasin, Ahlam and Siraj Munir.
«Beet El Natash» with Shadia, Ismail Yasin and Abdel Fatah Al Kasri.
«Halaal Aleek » with Hoda Shams El Deen, Souraya Helmy and Ismail Yasin.
«El Sir Fe Beer» with Charanfantah, Widad Hamdi and Mahmoud Choukoukou.
«Tiger » with Naima Akef, Zaki Rostom and Anwar Wagdi.زي

Actor Elias Moadab took part in many of the comedy movies with his «Shami» (Lebanese) accent that ushered into the world of comedy people like Ismail Yasin and others. It got stuck in people's head that he was Syrian or Lebanese or something like that when in reality he was full-fledged Egyptian who lived in the Jewish quarter (Haret al Yahood).
Elias, died In Cairo, 28 May 1952.

See also
 List of Egyptians

External links
 إلياس مؤدب أشهر شامي في السينما المصرية
يهود مصر

20th-century Egyptian male actors
Egyptian male film actors
1916 births
1952 deaths
Egyptian comedians
Egyptian Jews
Male actors from Cairo
20th-century comedians